Zinc finger protein 571 is a protein that in humans is encoded by the ZNF571 gene.

References

Further reading